Moses ben Joseph di Trani the Elder, known by his acronym Mabit (Salonica, Rumelia Eyalet in Ottoman Greece 1500 – Jerusalem, Ottoman Empire 1580) was a 16th-century rabbi in Safed.

His father had fled to Salonica from Apulia three years prior to his birth. While still a boy Moses was sent to Adrianople to pursue the study of the Talmud under the supervision of his uncle Aaron. At the age of sixteen he went to Safed and completed his studies under Jacob Berab. In 1525 he was appointed rabbi of Safed; he held this office for some fifty-five years, when he eventually moved to Jerusalem.

According to a 16th-century Jewish traveler who visited Safed in 1567, Rabbi Moses di Trani was still living in Safed:

Works 

Moses di Trani was the author of:
 Bet Elohim (Venice, 1576), a moral and philosophical work on prayer, atonement, and the fundamental principles of faith
 Kiryat Sefer (Venice, 1551), a commentary on the Bible, the Talmud, and difficult passages in the commentaries of Maimonides
 Sefer ha-Tehiyyah weha-Pedut (Mantua, 1556; Wilna, 1799; Sudzilkov, 1834; Warsaw, 1841), a commentary and notes on ch. vii and viii of Saadia Gaon's Emunot we-Deot
 She'elot u-Teshubot (vol. i, ib. 1629; vol. ii, ib. 1630), a collection of 841 responsa, with an index

References

External links 
 Bet Elohim (Venice, 1576) - free scanned version in DJVU format
 She'elot uTeshuvot (Lvov, 1861) - free scanned version in PDF format

1505 births
1585 deaths
Rabbis from Thessaloniki
16th-century rabbis from the Ottoman Empire
Rabbis in Ottoman Galilee
Rabbis in Safed
Burials at the Old Jewish Cemetery, Safed
Authors of books on Jewish law